Thomas Alfred Jackson (21 August 1879 – 18 August 1955) was a founding member of the Socialist Party of Great Britain and later the Communist Party of Great Britain. He was a leading communist activist and newspaper editor and worked variously as a party functionary and a freelance lecturer.

Biography

Early years
Jackson was born in Clerkenwell, London on 21 August 1879. His father, Thomas Blackwell Jackson, was a compositor and a firm Gladstonian liberal and trade unionist with Fenian sympathies. A keen reader from an early age, Jackson's formal education was limited to his attendance at Duncombe Road School in Upper Holloway, a board school at which he was a pupil between the ages of seven and thirteen-and-a-half. Jackson was apprenticed in the printing trade as a compositor after leaving school, but soon after becoming a journeyman compositor became a full-time speaker and orator, and later a writer.

Political career

Jackson dated his political conversion to socialism to 1900, after he read a copy of Robert Blatchford's book Merrie England which had been given to him years earlier by an older colleague at the printworks where he had been apprenticed. That year he joined the Social Democratic Federation, where he developed his oratorical skills at open-air meetings, overcoming the shyness he had endured as a child. Whilst a member of the SDF, he attended party classes on Marx's Capital which were taught by Jack Fitzgerald, who Jackson described as "very nearly the best-read man I have ever met". He helped found the Socialist Party of Great Britain with the London-based part of the SDF's Impossibilist faction in 1904. Briefly General Secretary in 1906, he was a very active speaker but, perhaps oddly given his later career, wrote only two brief items for the Socialist Standard. He resigned on 9 March 1909 to become paid speaker for the Independent Labour Party in Bristol and South Wales, initially spending three months in Bristol before moving to Newport, where he stayed until the summer of 1911.

He left the ILP in 1911, then becoming a speaker for the National Secular Society in Leeds and finally a freelance lecturer, after being the subject of complaints for discussing his atheism whilst speaking for the ILP and for promoting his socialist beliefs when speaking for the NSS. During the First World War he was arrested and charged under the Defence of the Realm Act 1914 after telling a local Conservative leader that the workers of Leeds would dispose of the "imitation Kaisers" of the city once they had done the same to the German Kaiser: however the case was eventually dismissed by the magistrate. He subsequently found employment as a storekeeper and in 1917 he joined the Socialist Labour Party, becoming a lecturer for the North East Labour College Committee in 1919, travelling the villages of the Great Northern Coalfield to teach classes on Marxism.

In 1920, Jackson was a founding member of the Communist Party of Great Britain, although he was not present at the foundation congress. In the early 1920s, he paid visits to Dublin, where he met Constance Markievicz, Charlotte Despard and Maud Gonne, and Moscow, where he was introduced to Joseph Stalin, Sen Katayama and Clara Zetkin, although a planned meeting with Vladimir Lenin was cancelled due to the latter's illness. During the 1920s, he was a major figure in the CPGB, being on the Central Committee from 1924 to 1929 and editor of The Communist and The Sunday Worker. He was one of those arrested before the General Strike of 1926. He was removed from the leadership in 1929, essentially for opposing the ‘Left turn’ of the Third Period (which characterised the Labour Party as ‘social-fascist’), but remained a paid journalist for the CPGB, being a frequent contributor to the Daily Worker and writing several CPGB pamphlets. In the 1940s, he returned to his roots, working as a lecturer on Communist theory for the Party's Education Department, travelling across the country for eight or nine months of the year.

 Jackson was married to another SPGB founder member, Kate Hawkins, a socialist and suffragette descended from naval commander (and early slave trader) Sir John Hawkins and a cousin of Anthony Hope, the author of The Prisoner of Zenda. The couple had three daughters: Eleanor (who died in infancy), Stella and Vivien, who was a teacher at Summerhill School and married A.L. Morton. Kate died in January 1927, having been committed to Claybury Hospital due to declining mental health. Jackson married a second time later that year, to Lydia Packman: she died unexpectedly in 1943 following a minor operation. Before 1914 he was notable in the North and Wales, and for his flowing locks according to his obituary. His Manchester Guardian obituary said he was a "Marxist scholar of weight", and that Solo Trumpet was a "racy autobiography". Historian Stuart Macintyre has described Jackson's book Dialectics: The Logic of Marxism and its Critics as "perhaps... the most considerable literary achievement of Jackson's generation of working-class intellectuals".

In the early 1930s, he was secretary of the League of Militant Atheists.

Jackson's 1935 pamphlet The Jubilee- and How was a critique of the British monarchy, arguing the Silver Jubilee of George V was inappropriate at a time of widespread unemployment.

Death and legacy

Tommy Jackson died at Clare, Suffolk on 18 August 1955, just three days shy of his 76th birthday.

Bibliography
as T. A. Jackson, published by Lawrence and Wishart. 
Dialectics: The Logic of Marxism and its critics (1936) 
Charles Dickens: The Progress of a Radical (1938)
Trials of British Freedom (1940) 
Solo Trumpet (his 1953 autobiography) 
Ireland Her Own: An Outline History of the Irish Struggle for National Freedom and Independence (1970)

Footnotes

Sources consulted
Obituary in Manchester Guardian of 19 August 1955 p3
Socialist Party of Great Britain 1904–1913 membership register.
Justice.
Thomas A. Jackson. Solo Trumpet.
"Thomas A. Jackson". Dictionary of Labour Biography, Volume IV.
Vivien Morton and Stuart Macintyre. TA Jackson: A Centenary Appreciation. Our History pamphlet 73, 1979.
Socialist Standard, August 1909.

External links
T.A. Jackson Archive Marxists Internet Archive

Communist Party of Great Britain members
Socialist Party of Great Britain members
Social Democratic Federation members
Independent Labour Party politicians
1879 births
1955 deaths
People from Clerkenwell
English atheists
English socialists
British atheism activists
19th-century atheists
20th-century atheists
British political party founders